Bayou Township, Arkansas may refer to:

 Bayou Township, Ashley County, Arkansas
 Bayou Township, Baxter County, Arkansas

See also 
 List of townships in Arkansas

Arkansas township disambiguation pages